The Polissya hotel is one of the tallest buildings in the abandoned city of Pripyat, Ukraine (which was affected by the Chernobyl disaster). It was built in the mid-1970s to house delegations and guests visiting the Chernobyl Nuclear Power Plant. Currently, the hotel is half-ruined. 

The hotel continued to be occupied many days and weeks after evacuation of Pripyat, in order to house the nuclear engineers came from all USSR, to eat and sleep, for observing the scale of the disaster and evaluating the consequences. The Hotel was also used for crisis meetings.

In popular culture
 The hotel is a primary setting for the acclaimed 2019 miniseries Chernobyl.
 The hotel is featured in fourth-to-last level of the game S.T.A.L.K.E.R.: Shadow of Chernobyl, where it is the location of a crucial mission to obtain the game's best ending. 
 The hotel is visible in the background of the Pripyat level of S.T.A.L.K.E.R.: Call of Pripyat, though it is outside the playable area.
 The hotel is featured in Call of Duty 4: Modern Warfare, where Price and MacMillan shoot Zakhaev from. 
 The hotel is seen in Suede's music video, "Life Is Golden".
 The hotel is featured in a few levels of the game Chernobylite. The building model (both inside and outside) is made using photogrammetry, and players are able to explore the building through the missions.

References

External links 

Buildings and structures in Pripyat
Hotels in Ukraine
Chernobyl Exclusion Zone
Hotels built in the Soviet Union
Defunct hotels
Hotel buildings completed in 1975
1975 establishments in Ukraine